Christoph Zimmermann (born 12 January 1993) is a German professional footballer who plays as a centre-back for   club Darmstadt 98.

Career

Early career
Zimmermann joined Borussia Dortmund II in 2014 from Borussia Mönchengladbach. He made his professional debut in the 3. Liga on 26 July 2014 against Rot-Weiß Erfurt.

Norwich City
On 15 June 2017, Zimmerman agreed to join English club Norwich City on a two-year deal when his contract expired at Borussia Dortmund II on 1 July 2017. Zimmermann made his debut for Norwich City in a 1–1 draw against Fulham on 5 August 2017. He scored his first goal for Norwich in a 2–2 draw at Wolverhampton Wanderers on 21 February 2018. He lifted the Championship title on 5 May 2019 at Villa Park after a 2–1 win for Norwich sealed their return to the Premier League.

Zimmermann made his Premier League debut for Norwich against West Ham United on 31 August 2019 in a 2–0 loss.

Darmstadt 
On 20 July 2022, Zimmermann signed a three-year contract with German second-tier club Darmstadt 98 in an undisclosed transfer.

Career statistics

Honours
Norwich City
EFL Championship: 2018–19, 2020–21

References

External links

1993 births
Living people
German footballers
Association football defenders
Borussia Mönchengladbach II players
Borussia Dortmund II players
Norwich City F.C. players
Regionalliga players
3. Liga players
2. Bundesliga players
SV Darmstadt 98 players
English Football League players
German expatriate footballers
Expatriate footballers in England
German expatriate sportspeople in England
Premier League players
Footballers from Düsseldorf